{{DISPLAYTITLE:C17H24O10}}
The molecular formula C17H24O10 (molar mass: 388.37 g/mol, exact mass: 388.1369 u) may refer to:

 Secologanin
 Verbenalin

Molecular formulas